The Delaware River Composite Truss Bridge is a composite Parker truss and Warren truss bridge in Valley Falls, Kansas.  It was built in 1936.  It was listed on the National Register of Historic Places in 2003.

That is flanked by two  Warren pony truss spans.
Each of the trusses has seven slopes forming its top chords.

It brings Coal Creek Road across the Delaware River, 0.1 miles south of the road's intersection with 170th Rd., at the city limits of Valley Falls.

References

Bridges on the National Register of Historic Places in Kansas
Bridges completed in 1936
Jefferson County, Kansas
Bridges in Kansas